Jean-Pierre Goudeau (born 25 February 1933) is a French former athlete who competed in the 1952 Summer Olympics and in the 1956 Summer Olympics.

References

1933 births
Living people
French male sprinters
Olympic athletes of France
Athletes (track and field) at the 1952 Summer Olympics
Athletes (track and field) at the 1956 Summer Olympics
European Athletics Championships medalists